Mari-Lynn Poskin is an American politician serving as a member of the Kansas House of Representatives from the 20th district. Elected in November 2020, she assumed office on January 11, 2021.

Early life and education 
Poskin was born in Merced, California. After attending the University of Southern California, she earned a Bachelor of Science degree in English, psychology, and education from the University of Nebraska–Lincoln.

Career 
Poskin has worked as a grant writer for the Northern Illinois Council on Alcoholism and Substance Abuse. From 2005 to 2014, she was an information and resource specialist at the Johnson County Community College. Since 2017, Poskin has worked as freelance education consultant. She was elected to the Kansas House of Representatives in November 2020 and assumed office on January 11, 2021.

References 

University of Nebraska–Lincoln alumni
Democratic Party members of the Kansas House of Representatives
Women state legislators in Kansas
21st-century American politicians
21st-century American women politicians
Year of birth missing (living people)
Living people
People from Merced, California